Robert A. Armstrong was an American retired ice hockey defenseman who was an All-American for Clarkson.

Early life 
Armstrong graduated from Ithaca High School in 1979 and then spent a year at Northwood Prep School. While there he worked as a driver at the 1980 Winter Olympics and served as an usher during the Miracle on Ice game between the United States and the Soviet Union.

Career 
Armstrong began attending Clarkson University in the fall of 1980. Clarkson made appearances in the NCAA Tournament in each of Armstrong's first two seasons and, though he was a bit player as a freshman, Armstrong had a much more integral role in 1982. After several of the top players graduated that year, Clarkson declined in Armstrong's junior season. He was named team captain for his senior year and the team rebounded. Armstrong led the defense in scoring and Clarkson finished third in the ECAC Tournament, their best finish in over a decade. The team made its third national tournament with Armstrong before their defeat against Minnesota–Duluth in the quarterfinals. Armstrong had scored with 61 seconds left but the team was unable to tie the series before time ran out.

Armstrong's playing career ended upon his graduation. While working for Stearns & Wheeler as an engineer, Armstrong began coaching high school hockey and baseball. He was involved with several youth teams in the Buffalo–Niagara Falls metropolitan area.

Personal life 
Armstrong died unexpectedly at the age of 50 at the Millard Fillmore Suburban Hospital.

Statistics

Regular season and playoffs

Awards and honors

References

External links

1961 births
2012 deaths
Ice hockey players from New York (state)
People from Ithaca, New York
American men's ice hockey defensemen
AHCA Division I men's ice hockey All-Americans
Clarkson Golden Knights men's ice hockey players
Ithaca High School (Ithaca, New York) alumni